INS Tihayu (T93) is a patrol vessel of the Car Nicobar-class of Indian Navy and the third ship in the series of four Water Jet Fast Attack Craft (WJFAC). Named after Tihayu island of Nicobar archipelago the ship can have an additional package of about 11 machine guns of different variants. The ship equipped with enhanced firepower is capable of operating in shallow waters at high speed. Suited for extended coastal and offshore surveillance and patrol, production of the Car Nicobar-class ships by GRSE was fast-tracked after the 2008 Mumbai terror attacks.

References

Car Nicobar-class patrol vessels
2015 ships